The Bergsøysund Bridge is a pontoon bridge that crosses the Bergsøysundet strait between the islands of Aspøya (in Tingvoll) and Bergsøya (in Gjemnes) in Møre og Romsdal county, Norway. The bridge has 13 spans.

Bergsøysund Bridge was opened in 1992. It is part of the Krifast system, the town of Kristiansund's road connection to the mainland. The bridge cost .

Construction
Floating bridge/pontoon bridge construction has a long history in military and civilian applications on every continent except Antarctica. According to the engineers who designed this bridge, it was designed using recent American technology for floating bridges, combined with Norwegian technology for offshore platforms. The bridge designers researched other bridges in the world and traveled to the state of Washington in the United States to visit the Homer M. Hadley Memorial Bridge and the Hood Canal Bridge—two floating bridges. The continuous floating concrete structure used in the Washington bridges was ultimately ruled out in favor of the discrete floating concrete pier design. This design afforded: 1) an elevated roadway that reduced traffic hazards in storms, 2) a reduction in corrosion of the bridge deck, and 3) improved passage of water beneath the bridge thereby supporting native species.

See also
List of bridges in Norway
List of bridges in Norway by length
List of bridges
List of bridges by length
Gjemnessund Bridge
Straumsund Bridge

References

Bridges in Møre og Romsdal
Bridges completed in 1992
Pontoon bridges
Gjemnes
Tingvoll
1992 establishments in Norway
European route E39 in Norway
Norwegian National Road 70